Shane & Shane is a Texas-based contemporary worship music band known for acoustic praise and worship music. The band consists of Shane Barnard (vocals, acoustic guitar) and Shane Everett (vocals). They are often joined by their drummer and manager, Joey Parish.

Background

Shane Barnard
Barnard grew up in Lubbock, Texas, where he attended Texas Tech University and later Texas A&M University. It was there that he led worship at the popular Christian student gathering Breakaway, and where he met Everett. Barnard is also known for his unique style of strumming the acoustic guitar and his high vocal range.

During his junior year as a student at Texas A&M University, Barnard began a recording career. Prior to joining Everett, Barnard teamed up with friend Caleb Carruth to release an album. Entitled Salvation Still Remains, it was released in limited numbers. Barnard and Carruth later agreed to end their partnership amicably, stating that they "were just moving in different directions."

Barnard is married to fellow CCM artist Bethany Dillon.

Shane Everett
Everett attended Texas A&M University. One night after playing with his band in a bar, Everett felt moved by God, which led him to quit his band and start attending church regularly. Shortly thereafter, he met Barnard, and became part of Breakaway Ministries, a weekly student-led praise and worship service at Texas A&M.

Band 
The band originally began with Barnard performing solo acts, but Everett increasingly played a major role in his performances. In 2002, the band released their first album, Psalms, under the new name "Shane & Shane". The duo continued to release albums in the following years, including Carry Away (2003), Upstairs (2004), and Clean (2004). The duo went on hiatus for a year after the release of An Evening With Shane & Shane, a live CD/DVD. Following the hiatus, the group released five albums in the next six years, including The One You Need (2011), which charted at No. 53 on the Billboard 200, making it their highest-charting album. The One You Need was also the first album released under the Fair Trade record label.

In 2014, following a successful Kickstarter campaign, Shane & Shane launched a project, "The Worship Initiative", a paid membership website with instructional videos and chord charts for popular worship songs. As part of the project, they have released multiple albums including two Christmas albums. Their subsequent studio albums, The Worship Initiative and Psalms II, are also included in the project.

Discography

Individual
 Salvation Still Remains - 1998 (Shane Barnard & Caleb Carruth)
 Rocks Won't Cry (1998), Shane Barnard (Independent)
 Psalms (2001), Shane Barnard (Independent)
 Window to the Inner Court (2001), Shane Everett

Band

Studio
 Psalms (2002), Inpop
 Carry Away (2003), Inpop
 Upstairs (2004), Inpop
 Clean (2004), Inpop
 Pages (2007), Inpop
 Glory in the Highest: A Christmas Record (2008), Inpop
 Everything Is Different (2009), Inpop
 The One You Need (2011), Fair Trade
 Bring Your Nothing (2013), Fair Trade
 The Worship Initiative (2015), Fair Trade
 Psalms II (2015), WellHouse

Guest appearances
 Bluegrass Sampler (featuring Peasall Sisters) (2006), Inpop
 Dare 2 Share - Unending Worship (2010), Dare2Share

Other works
Christian hip-hop artist Tedashii features Shane & Shane on his song "Finally" which is in his album Blacklight.

In the David Crowder Band's EP B Collision Shane & Shane sing on two live tracks along with Robbie Seay.

References

External links
 
 Shane B Web - lyrics and guitar tabs
 

American Christian musical groups
Fair Trade Services artists
Inpop Records artists
People from Garland, Texas
Texas A&M University alumni
Musical groups established in 2001